This article presents a list of the historical events and publications of Australian literature during 1959.

Books 
 Nancy Cato – Time, Flow Softly
 Jon Cleary
 Back of Sunset
 Strike Me Lucky with Joy Cleary
 Eleanor Dark – Lantana Lane
 David Forrest – The Last Blue Sea
 Xavier Herbert – Seven Emus
 Dorothy Hewett – Bobbin Up : A Novel
 Barbara Jefferis – Half Angel
 Eric Lambert – Glory Thrown In
 Leonard Mann – Andrea Caslin
 D'Arcy Niland
 The Big Smoke
 Gold in the Streets
 Vance Palmer – The Big Fellow
 George Turner – Young Man of Talent
 Arthur Upfield
 Bony and the Black Virgin (aka The Tom Branch)
 Journey to the Hangman
 Morris West – The Devil's Advocate

Short stories 
 Ethel Anderson – Little Ghosts
 David Campbell – Flame and Shadow : Selected Stories
 A. Bertram Chandler
 "Chance Encounter"
 "The Man Who Couldn't Stop"
 David Forrest – "That Barambah Mob"
 Hal Porter
 "Country Town"
 "Fiend and Friend"
 Katharine Susannah Prichard – N'goola and Other Stories
 Judith Wright
 "In the Park"

Children's and Young Adult fiction 
 Eleanor Spence – The Summer in Between
 Kylie Tennant – All the Proud Tribesmen
 Norman Barnett Tindale and H. A. Lindsay – Rangatira

Poetry 

 John Blight – "A Sailor's Grave"
 David Campbell – "We Took the Storms to Bed"
 Bruce Dawe – "The City : Midnight"
 Rosemary Dobson
 "Captain Svenson"
 "The Edge"
 Geoffrey Dutton – "January"
 R. D. Fitzgerald – "Quayside Meditation"
 William Hart-Smith – Poems of Discovery
 Gwen Harwood – "Prize-Giving"
 Charles Higham – The Earthbound and Other Poems
 A. D. Hope – "Agony Column"
 Lionel Lindsay – Discobolus and Other Verse
 Nan McDonald – The Lighthouse and Other Poems
 David Martin – "Gordon Childe"
 Ian Mudie – The Blue Crane
 Elizabeth Riddell
 "After Lunik Two"
 "Suburban Song"
 Douglas Stewart – "Leopard-Skin"
 Chris Wallace-Crabbe – The Music of Division
 Francis Webb – "Art"

Biography 
 Charmian Clift – Peel Me a Lotus
 Mary Durack – Kings in Grass Castles
 Errol Flynn – My Wicked, Wicked Ways
 Ion Idriess – The Tin Scratchers
 Peter Ryan – Fear Drive My Feet

Children's and Young Adult non-fiction 
 Dale Collins – Anzac Adventure

Awards and honours

Literary

Children and Young Adult

Poetry

Births 
A list, ordered by date of birth (and, if the date is either unspecified or repeated, ordered alphabetically by surname) of births in 1959 of Australian literary figures, authors of written works or literature-related individuals follows, including year of death.

 28 January – Philip Hodgins, poet (died 1995)
 18 May – Sophie Masson, novelist
27 June – Stephen Dedman, writer
13 October – Doug MacLeod, children's writer, poet, screenwriter and playwright (died 2021)
 25 November – Merlinda Bobis, writer and academic

Unknown date
 Jennifer Fallon, novelist
 Andy Kissane, poet
 Mike Ladd, poet

Deaths 
A list, ordered by date of death (and, if the date is either unspecified or repeated, ordered alphabetically by surname) of deaths in 1959 of Australian literary figures, authors of written works or literature-related individuals follows, including year of birth.

 15 July – Vance Palmer, novelist (born 1885)
 14 October – Errol Flynn, author and actor (born 1909)

See also 
 1959 in Australia
 1959 in literature
1959 in poetry
 List of years in Australian literature
List of years in literature

References

 
Australian literature by year
20th-century Australian literature
1959 in literature